Abigail Rogan (known mononymously as Abigail; born 23 July 1946) is an English-born retired actress particularly of television soap operas and film and was also briefly a vocalist.

She emigrated from London in 1968 and became one of Australia's significant sex symbols of the early-1970s, promoted as a sultry blonde siren in the vein of Marilyn Monroe and Brigitte Bardot.

She appeared in numerous soap opera's including, Number 96, Sons and Daughters and Chances.

Biography

Early life

Abigail was born in London, England in 1946 to a mother of Ceylonese (now Sri Lanki), of Dutch Burghers descent and educated in France, she started her career in her native United Kingdom, appearing in such roles as Robin Hood and theContinental Theatre, she arrived in Australia to study civil engineering whilst acting part time, but made a major foray in showbiz when she was given the chance to appear as the female lead in a local theatre production of the British comedy There's a Girl in My Soup in 1968. She settled in Sydney and appeared in an advert with Phil Silvers and the TV series Delta.

Television soap opera
She is best known for her roles in several prominent Australian TV soap operas, where she became known simply as Abigail. She first became best as a sex symbol in Number 96, as an original cast member and the first actress to play artist'ss model Bev Houghton with her character providing fleeting nude glimpses. She became Australia's undisputed sex symbol of the early 1970s through the role. However, although most people assume she was the first woman on local TV to go topless, in fact it was her co-star of the naive Rose Godulfus (Vivienne Garrett). To the surprise of her fans she was written out of the series after a dispute, although it was stated in th media at the time she had left to appear in a movie in mid 1973, and the character was re-cast with Victoria Raymond assuming the role. She did however return to the soap in 1976 as the character of Eve.

She appeared in the sex-comedy film Alvin Purple and the sequel Alvin Rides Again

She had a role in The Young Doctors, as cold and assertive Hilary Templeton. Around the same time, she appeared in Glenview High.

In 1985, she became well known for her role in the successful series, Sons and Daughters, as conniving Caroline "The Cat" Morrell opposite Normie Rowe, the series sold well internationally, especially in Belgium.

She subsequently appeared in numerous other soap opera roles, including Neighbours in 1989, and Family and Friends, in a regular role during 1990 until that series was cancelled. She then appeared in Chances as Bambi Shute, the host of a TV sex show, for most of 1992.

Abigail was twice married; first to her manager actor Mark Hashfield (who also appeared on Number 96 as Alan Cotterill) and then to actor Adrian Wright.

Publishing and music

In 1973, after leaving Number 96, she published her autobiography, Call Me Abigail which sold 150,000 copies in its first two weeks of sale. Also in 1973, Abigail made an attempt, one of the first soap stars to do so (prior to Kylie Minogue) at a popular music career and scored a hit with a cover of Serge Gainsbourg's "Je t'aime... moi non plus", which reached the top 10 in Australia. Although this debut was a success, follow-ups, including a comedic release with ventriloquist Chris Kirby, were not.

Film, TV and theatre

During this period she appeared in a series of brief cameo roles in a string of sex comedy films such as Alvin Purple (1973), and its 1974 sequel Alvin Rides Again. In 1974, Abigail would perform a striptease in the burlesque comedy "The Legend of San Peel" in The Barrel Theatre, a well-known strip palace in Kings Cross, while struggling to find serious acting jobs. In 1975, in a brief return to television she appeared in Class of '75 for three weeks as a prim French Senior Mistress in a black wig and frumpy spectacles. Also in 1975 she played Esmerelda in The True Story of Eskimo Nell and in 1976 appeared in another bawdy comedy Eliza Fraser.

Abigail returned to Number 96 in November 1976. Her new comedy character, the oft-divorced Eve, would potentially appear in a spinoff series, Fair Game, with Elaine Lee and Lynette Curran. It did not eventuate, although the completed pilot was divided up to create segments of three episodes of Number 96 (Episodes 1079–1081).

Abigail also appeared in a recurring sketch in comedy series The Norman Gunston Show called "The Checkout Chicks". This sketch, a send-up of melodramatic soap operas set in a supermarket, mostly featured other former Number 96 actors - Vivienne Garrett, Candy Raymond, Philippa Baker, Judy Lynne and Anne Louise Lambert. The show was finally cancelled in July 1977.

In 1977, Abigail appeared in the hospital-based series The Young Doctors as super-efficient secretary Hilary Templeton who worked for Philip Winter (Noel Trevarthen), a celebrity patient of the hospital. In the show, Winter is murdered and she leaves the storyline, only to later return with her character now running the company of her former boss. Also in 1977 she had a cameo role in the film Summer City, which is notable for being the first to have Mel Gibson in a major role.

Abigail had some success in the theatre, specialising in comedy roles. She toured New South Wales and Queensland with the stage farce A Bedfull of Foreigners in 1983. In 1984 she appeared in Melvin, Son of Alvin. In 1985, Abigail scored a regular role in another soap opera Sons and Daughters, playing the role of Caroline Morrell, alongside former pop singer Normie Rowe, a role she continued until the series ended in 1987. In 1988, she appeared in Breaking Loose. In 1989 she co-starred in Elly & Jools playing the crazy Country & Western singer wannabe, Dulcie Dickson. In 1990 she appeared in Sher Mountain Killings Mystery and was a regular cast member of the short-lived soap opera Family and Friends and in 1991 appeared in another soap Chances.  In 1994 she presented a prime-time repeat of the 1976 Number 96 retrospective, And They Said It Couldn't Last.

Retirement from acting

Her last role was in 2000, but in 2002, she briefly became a spokesperson for weight-loss company Jenny Craig.  She claimed to have lost 17 kilograms in seven weeks.

Abigail was interviewed on Sydney radio station 2GB on her 60th birthday in 2006. At that time she was living on the Gold Coast, Queensland.

In March 2011, Australian current affairs program Today Tonight produced a story on Abigail, claiming that she had fallen on hard times, and claiming she was living as a squatter in a derelict church. A rebuttal story was aired the following evening by rival current affairs program, A Current Affair.  In fact she had been living there with permission, with her husband, as her home had been partially destroyed by floods.  Her damaged home was being prepared for rebuilding.  The Today Tonight story captured some hidden camera footage of Abigail.  She did not appear on camera consensually.

Filmography

Filmography

FILM

Television

TELEVISION
{|class="wikitable
|-
|Year
|Title
|Role
|Type
|-
|   
| Robin Hood
| Young Child
| TV series UK, 1 episode
|-
| 
| Continental Theatre
| Role unknown
| TV series, UK, 1 episode
|-
| 1969
| Delta
| Guest role
| TV series, 2 episodes
|-
| 1972-1973; 1976
| Number 96
| Regular role: Bev Houghton / Eve
| TV series, 77 episodes
|-
| 1972
| The Tony Hancock Special
| Herself - Guest
| TV special
|-
| 1973
| The Barry Crocker Comedy Hour
| Herself - Guest
| TV special
|-
| 1973
| The Paul Hogan Show
| Herself / Singer sings "Je taime"
| TV series, 1 episode
|-
| 1973
| Two-Up Goes Legal
| Herself 
| TV special
|-
| 1973
| The Wicked City
| Role unknown
| TV movie
|-
| 1974
| Ted Hamilton's Musical World
| Herself - Guest
| TV series, 1 episode
|-
| 1974
| No Man's Land
| Herself
| TV series, 1 episode
|-
| 1974
| This Love Affair
| Guest role: Helen
| ABC TV series, 1 episode 2: 'Tilting At Windmills'
|-
| 1975
| Class of '75
| Regular role: Angelique Dupree
| TV series, 98 episodes
|-
| 1975
| The Norman Gunston Show
| Herself - Guest 
| ABC TV series, 1 episode
|-
| 1975
| The Norman Gunston Show 'The Check-Out Chicks' sketch 
| Herself
| ABC TV series, 8 episodes
|-
| 1975
| Celebrity Squares
| Herself
| TV series
|-
| 1976
| Fair Game
| Lead role: Eve
| TV pilot
|-
| 1976
| Number 96
| Regular role: Eve
| TV series, 3 episodes
|-
| 1976
| The Bluestone Boys
| Guest role
| TV series, 1 episode
|-
| 1976
| Up the Convicts
| Guest role: Sharlot (uncredited)
| TV series, 1 episode
|-
| 1976
| The Celebrity Game
| Herself 
| TV series
|-
| 1976
| Murcheson Creek
| Lead role: Donna Lewis
| TV movie
|-
| 1976;1994
| Number 96: And They Said It Wouldn't Last
| Bev Houghton (archive clips)
| TV special
|-
| 1977
| The Young Doctors
| Recurring role: Hiliary Templeton
| TV series
|-
| 1977
| Graham Kennedy's Blankety Blanks
| Herself - Panelist
| TV series, 3 episodes
|-
| 1977
| All at Sea
| Regular role: Denise Demour
| TV movie
|-
| 1977
| The Maggi Eckhardt Hour
| Herself - Guest
| TV series, 1 episode
|-
| 1978
| Glenview High
| Guest role
| TV series, 1 episode
|-
| 1978
| Cappriccio
| Herself - Guest
| ABC TV series, 1 episode
|-
| 1978
| The Zodiac Girls
| Herself
| TV pilot
|-
| 1979
| Chopper Squad
| Guest role: Alison Burns
| TV series, 1 episode '
|-
| 1980
| Celebrity Tattletales
| Herself & Mark Hashfield
| TV series, 3 episodes
|-
| 1980
| Catch Us If You Can
| Herself
| TV special
|-
| 1980
| The Variety Club Race Day
| Herself
| TV special
|-
| 1980
| Home Sweet Home
| Guest role: Patient
| ABC TV series, 1 episode
|-
| 1981
| Trial By Marriage
| Guest role: Laivinia
| ABC TV series, 1 episode
|-
| 1981
| Are You Being Served?
| Guest role: Perfume Saleswoman
| TV series, 1 episode
|-
| 1981
| The Great Australian Arguement Settler
| Herself (pin-up)
| TV special
|-
| 1982
| The Australian Way: A Salute to Aussie Sex Appeal
| Herself - Guest
| TV special
|-
| 1984
| Special Squad
| Guest role: Mrs. Quinn
| TV series, 1 episode
|-
| 1985-1987
| Sons and Daughters
| Regular role: Caroline Morrell
| TV series, 410 episodes
|-
| 1985-1988
| Channel Seven Perth Telethon
| Herself
| TV special
|-
| 1986
| The 28th Annual TV Week Logie Awards
| Herself - Presenter
| TV special
|-
| 1986
| Kids Telethon Ten 21st Birthday Show
| Herself
| TV special
|-
| 1986
| Punchlines
| Herself
| TV special
|-
| 1987
| Have a Go
| Herself - Guest Judge
| TV series, 3 episodes
|-
| 1987
| The 29th Annual TV Week Logie Awards
| Herself
| TV special
|-
| 1987
|  Discovering Australia
| Herself - Narrator
| Film documentary
|-
| 1988
| Late Night Oz
| Herself - Guest
| TV series, 1 episode
|-
| 1989
| Neighbours
| Guest recurring role: Betty Bristow
| TV series, 3 episodes
|-
| 1989
| Rafferty's Rules
| Guest role: Michelle Dobbs
| TV series, 1 episode
|-
| 1989
| 60 Minutes
| Herself with Leila Hayes
| TV series, 1 episode
|-
| 1989
| Bodysurfer
| Support role: Mrs. James
| ABC TV miniseries, 2 episodes
|-
| 1990
| Elly & Jools
| Regular role: Dulcie Dickson
| TV series, 12 episodes
|-
| 1990
| Family and Friends
| Regular role: Doreen Stubbs
| TV series
|-
| 1990
| Celebrity Family Feud
| Herself
| TV series, 1 episode
|-
| 1991
| Col'n Carpenter
| Role unknown
| TV series, 1 episode
|-
| 1991
| Tonight Live with Steve Vizard
| Herself - Guest
| TV series, 1 episode
|-
| 1991;1995
| Good Morning Australia
| Herself - Guest
| TV series, 2 episodes
|-
| 1991
| Til Ten| Herself - Guest & Grant Dodwell
| TV series, 1 episode
|-
| 1991;1992
| In Sydney Today| Herself - Guest
| TV series, 2 episodes
|-
| 1991
| The Miraculous Mellops| Regular role: Iron Peg
| TV miniseries, 1 episode
|-
| 1992
| The Midday Show| Herself & Grant Dodwell
| TV series, 1 episode
|-
| 1992
| Chances| Recurring role: Bambi Shute
| TV series, 26 episodes
|-
| 1993
| Time Trax| Guest role: Georgette
| TV series US/AUSTRALIA, 1 episode
|-
| 1994
| Number 96: And They Said It Wouldn't Last| Herself intro to special
| TV special
|-
| 1995
| Ernie And Denise| Herself - Guest
| TV series, 1 episode
|-
| 1995
| Good Morning Australia| Herself - Guest
| TV series, 1 episode
|-
| 1995;2011
| A Current Affair| Herself
| TV series, 1 episode
|-
| 1995
| Eurotrash| Herself - Guest
| TV series UK, 1 episode
|-
| 1996
| Wedlocked| Guest role: Radner
| TV series, 1 episode
|-
| 1997
| Where Are They Now?| Herself - Guest
| TV series, 1 episode
|-
| 2008
| Not Quite Hollywood: Deleted and Extended Scenes| Herself
| Video
|-
| 2011
| Today Tonight| Herself & partner Adrian Wright
| TV series, 1 episode
|-
| 2011
| A Current Affair| Herself & partner Adrian Wright
| TV series, 1 episode
|-
| 2016
| RealTVFilms| Herself - Host
| TV series US, 2 episodes
|}

Theatre/Stage

 There's a Girl in my Soup (1968-1969)
 Rookery Nook (1970)
 Saga of San Peel (1975) 
 Wild Oats (1977)
 A Bedfull of Foreigners (1983)
 Rattle of a Simple Man (1987)
 My Fat Friend (1988)
 Lunatic Soup (1990)
 Charley's Aunt (1991-1992)

Discography
Singles
 1973 "Je T'aime" / "Last Tango in Paris" Festival Records (Australia) No. 6, 11 weeks
 1973 "Do It Again" / "Please Terry Do It One More Time" Festival Records (Australia) No chart position
 1974 "These Dreams" / "(Just As) I Am" Festival Records (Australia) No. 96, 1 week
 1976 "Biting My Nails" / "Stay A While" Festival Records (Australia) No chart position

Album
 1973  Abigail'' Festival Records (Australia) L-35260
 Side A: 1. "An Occasional Man" 2. "My Baby Does it Good" 3. "New Fangled Tango" 4. "These Dreams" 5. "Do It Again" 6. "Je T'aime"
 Side B ''' 1. "Sugar Me" 2. "The Man I Love" 3. "(Just As) I Am" 4. "Pillow Talk" 5. "Last Tango in Paris" 6. "Please Terry, Do It One More Time"*

The track "Please Terry Do It One More Time", is the one that features Chris Kirby.

Produced by Martin Erdman
Recorded at Festival's 'Studio 24", Sydney Australia
Terry appears by courtesy of Chris Kirby.

References

External links
 Biography
 Biography with references
 
 

Living people
1946 births
20th-century Australian actresses
21st-century Australian actresses
20th-century English actresses
21st-century English actresses
Actresses from London
Australian soap opera actresses
Australian women singers
English emigrants to Australia